The Challenge Yves du Manoir was a rugby union club competition that was played in France between 1931 and 2003 under different names. It is named after former player Yves du Manoir.

History
The Challenge Yves du Manoir was officially created on September 21, 1931, by Racing Club de France with the support of two other clubs, CA Bègles and AS Montferrand. In 1931, twelve breakaway clubs had decided to create their own league (UFRA, Union Française du Rugby Amateur) to protest against violence and covert professionalism which French rugby had sunk into, and which had resulted in the exclusion of France from the Five Nations Tournament that year.

Though Racing Club was not one of them and chose to remain loyal to the French Federation, its board considered it had a duty to put the fun back into rugby. Games were often restricted to the forwards, with wings sometimes not touching the ball once in the entire game. Therefore, organizers were very keen to ensure that teams had an attacking style of play, freed from the terse, stressful obligations of championship matches where winning was all that mattered. Special rules were introduced to encourage spectacular play, such as the banning of placed kicks (either penalty or conversion kicks) in order to accelerate the pace. The name of the competition has gone down in the history of French rugby as the epitome of le beau jeu (the beautiful game) and fair play.

Officially, participating clubs were invited by Racing Club de France. Seven of them took part in the inaugural competition. The first two cups were played in a round-robin format. Afterward, round-robin preliminary stages were played before play-offs took the top two teams to the final. The Challenge became the second club competition in France, very much like a cup competition in soccer is second to the championship. As a consequence, le Du-Manoir, as it was nicknamed, became a very sought-after title for all French clubs.

The competition bears the name of a young promising French international player from Racing Club de France, Yves du Manoir, who died in a plane crash in January 1928 at the age of 23. There was no competition between 1939 and 1952, a period during which the French Federation launched the Coupe de France.

In 1996–1997, the French Federation took over the competition as Trophée Du-Manoir Coupe de France. In 2001 it became the Coupe de la Ligue, then Challenge Sud-Radio for one year in 2003. The competition died out because of the lack of time available in the year and the development of European cups and international duties for top players.

Since 2004, the Challenge Yves du Manoir has been taken over by Racing Club de France as a youth competition for under 15. RC Narbonne won it in 9 times (12 finals, 20 semi finals, all records). Racing Club de France never won the competition, and was runner-up only once.

Finals

Winners
Finals lost are in brackets

RC Narbonne: 9 (3)
FC Lourdes: 6 (1)
Stade Toulousain: 5 (2)
US Dax: 5 (2)
AS Béziers: 4 (6)
SU Agen: 4 (4)
AS Montferrand (now ASM Clermont Auvergne): 3 (6)
Section Paloise: 3 (5)
USA Perpignan: 3 (5)
Stade Montois: 3 (1)
RC Toulon: 2 (3)
Biarritz Olympique: 2 (2)
Aviron Bayonnais: 2
Stade Rochelais: 2
CA Brive: 1 (4)
FC Grenoble: 1 (3)
Castres Olympique: 1 (1)
Lyon Olympique Universitaire: 1 (1)
SC Mazamet: 1 (1)
Stade Français: 1 (1)
US Cognac: 1
RC Nice: 1
CS Bourgoin-Jallieu 0 (4)
CA Bègles 0 (2)
FC Auch: 0 (1)
SC Graulhet: 0 (1)
Racing Club de France (now Racing Métro 92): 0 (1)

See also
Yves du Manoir
Racing Club de France

References
Le challenge Yves Du Manoir, de Jean Mérillon, éd. Chiron, 1990 (in French).

Rugby union competitions in France